Papratno (Cyrillic: Папратно) is a village in the municipality of Kakanj, Bosnia and Herzegovina. It contains one of the biggest production lines for compost.

Demographics 
According to the 2013 census, its population was 26.

References

Populated places in Kakanj